This is a list of diseases starting with the letter "K".

Ka

Kab–Kas
 Kabuki syndrome
 Kalam–Hafeez syndrome
 Kaler–Garrity–Stern syndrome
 Kallikrein hypertension
 Kallmann syndrome with Spastic paraplegia
 Kallmann syndrome with heart disease
 Kallmann syndrome, type 1, X linked
 Kallmann syndrome, type 3, recessive
 Kalyanraman syndrome
 Kantaputra–Gorlin syndrome
 Kaolin pneumoconiosis
 Kaplan–Plauchu–Fitch syndrome
 Kaplowitz–Bodurtha syndrome
 Kaposi sarcoma
 Kaposiform hemangioendothelioma
 Kapur–Toriello syndrome
 Karandikar–Maria–Kamble syndrome
 Karsch–Neugebauer syndrome
 Kartagener syndrome
 Kashani–Strom–Utley syndrome
 Kasznica–Carlson–Coppedge syndrome

Kat–Kaw
 Kathisophobia
 Katsantoni–Papadakou–Lagoyanni syndrome
 Katz syndrome
 Kaufman oculocerebrofacial syndrome
 Kawasaki syndrome

Ke

Kea–Ken
 Kearns–Sayre syndrome
 Keloids
 Kennedy disease
 Kennerknecht–Sorgo–Oberhoffer syndrome
 Kennerknecht–Vogel syndrome
 Kenny–Caffey syndrome
 Kenny–Caffey syndrome, type 1

Ker

Kera
 Keratitis, hereditary
 Keratoacanthoma familial
 Keratoacanthoma
 Keratoconjunctivitis sicca
 Keratoconus posticus circumscriptus
 Keratoconus
 Keratoderma hypotrichosis leukonychia
 Keratoderma palmoplantar deafness
 Keratoderma palmoplantar spastic paralysis
 Keratoderma palmoplantaris transgrediens
 Keratolytic winter erythema
 Keratomalacia
 Keratosis focal palmoplantar gingival
 Keratosis follicularis dwarfism cerebral atrophy
 Keratosis follicularis spinulosa decalvans
 Keratosis palmoplantaris adenocarcinoma of the colon
 Keratosis palmoplantaris esophageal colon cancer
 Keratosis palmoplantaris papulosa
 Keratosis palmoplantaris with corneal dystrophy
 Keratosis palmoplantar-periodontopathy
 Keratosis pilaris
 Keratosis, seborrheic

Keri–Kern
 Kerion celsi
 Kernicterus

Keu
 Keutel syndrome

Ki–Kn
 Ki-1cell lymphoma
 KID syndrome
 Kifafa seizure disorder
 Kikuchi disease
 Kimura disease
 King–Denborough syndrome
 Kjer's optic neuropathy
 Kleeblattschaedel syndrome
 Kleine–Levin syndrome
 Kleiner–Holmes syndrome
 Klinefelter's Syndrome
 Klippel–Feil syndrome
 Klippel–Feil deformity conductive deafness absent vagina
 Klippel–Feil syndrome dominant type
 Klippel–Feil syndrome recessive type
 Klippel–Trénaunay–Weber syndrome
 Klumpke paralysis
 Klüver–Bucy syndrome
 Kniest dysplasia
 Kniest-like dysplasia lethal
 Knobloch–Layer syndrome
 Knuckle pads, leuconychia and sensorineural deafness

Ko
 Kobberling–Dunnigan syndrome
 Kocher–Debré–Semelaigne syndrome
 Kohler disease
 Kohlschütter-Tönz syndrome
 Koilonychia
 Konigsmark–Knox–Hussels syndrome
 Koone–Rizzo–Elias syndrome
 Korsakoff's syndrome
 Korula–Wilson–Salomonson syndrome
 Kostmann syndrome
 Kosztolanyi syndrome
 Kotzot–Richter syndrome
 Kounis syndrome
 Kousseff–Nichols syndrome
 Kousseff syndrome
 Kowarski syndrome
 Kozlowski–Brown–Hardwick syndrome
 Kozlowski–Celermajer syndrome
 Kozlowski–Massen syndrome
 Kozlowski–Ouvrier syndrome
 Kozlowski–Rafinski–Klicharska syndrome
 Kozlowski–Tsuruta–Taki syndrome
 Kozlowski–Warren–Fisher syndrome
 Kozlowski–Krajewska syndrome

Kr–Ky
 Krabbe leukodystrophy
 Krasnow–Qazi syndrome
 Krause–Kivlin syndrome
 Krauss–Herman–Holmes syndrome
 Krieble–Bixler syndrome
 Kumar–Levick syndrome
 Kurczynski–Casperson syndrome
 Kuru
 Kuskokwim disease
 Kuster–Majewski–Hammerstein syndrome
 Kuster syndrome
 Kuzniecky syndrome
 Kwashiorkor
 Kyasanur forest disease
 Kyphosis
 Kyphosis brachyphalangy optic atrophy

K